The women's 300 metres time trial event at the 2010 Asian Games was held in Guangzhou Velodrome, Guangzhou on 23 November.

Schedule
All times are China Standard Time (UTC+08:00)

Results 
Legend
DNS — Did not start

References

External links
 
 2010 Asian Games - Roller Sports - Competition Schedule by Event

Roller sports at the 2010 Asian Games